The 2014 Senior League World Series took place from August 10–16 in Bangor, Maine, United States. Houston, Texas defeated Willemstad, Curaçao in the championship game.

Teams

Results

Group A

Group B

Elimination Round

References

Senior League World Series
Senior League World Series
Sports competitions in Maine
2014 in sports in Maine